Center Creek may refer to:

Center Creek (Minnesota)
Center Creek (Missouri)